Armani Jeans may refer to:

Armani Jeans (brand), a jeans brand by fashion house Giorgio Armani
Olimpia Milano, an Italian basketball club currently known as Armani Jeans Milano for sponsorship reasons